Nitin Narendra Menon (born 2 November 1983) is an Indian cricketer and umpire. He was a right-handed batsman, representing Madhya Pradesh in List A cricket. He is now an umpire and has stood in matches in the 2015–16 Ranji Trophy and the Sheffield Shield in Australia. In June 2020, he was promoted to the Elite Panel of ICC Umpires, replacing Nigel Llong. His father Narendra Menon was also an umpire.

Umpiring career
He stood in his first Twenty20 International (T20I) match between India and England on 26 January 2017. He stood in his first One Day International (ODI) match between Afghanistan and Ireland on 15 March 2017.

In October 2018, he was named as one of the twelve on-field umpires for the 2018 ICC Women's World Twenty20. He was the on-field umpire for the 2019 Indian Premier League Final along with Ian Gould.

Menon was one of the on-field umpires for the one-off Test match between Afghanistan and the West Indies in India in November 2019. He became the 62nd Indian to umpire at this level. In February 2020, the ICC named him as one of the umpires to officiate in matches during the 2020 ICC Women's T20 World Cup in Australia. 

In June 2020, Menon was elevated to Elite Panel of ICC Umpires replacing England's Nigel Llong, becoming the third Indian umpire to make into the list.

Menon was praised by the cricket fraternity for his umpiring during England's tour of India in 2021.

See also
 List of Test cricket umpires
 List of One Day International cricket umpires
 List of Twenty20 International cricket umpires

References

External links
Nitin Menon in Cricinfo
Nitin Menon in Cricket Online

1983 births
Living people
Indian cricketers
Indian cricket umpires
Indian Test cricket umpires
Indian One Day International cricket umpires
Indian Twenty20 International cricket umpires
Madhya Pradesh cricketers
Cricketers from Indore
Wicket-keepers